Animas Corporation was an American company that specialized in making insulin pumps. The company was founded by Katherine Crothall in 1996, had its initial public offering in May 2004 under the ticker symbol 'PUMP', and was ultimately acquired by Johnson & Johnson on February 18, 2006.  The business was headquartered in West Chester, Pennsylvania and forms part of the Johnson & Johnson Diabetes franchise along with Lifescan and several other companies producing medical products for the treatment and management of diabetes.

On October 5, 2017 Johnson & Johnson's Animas Corporation announced that they are closing down their operations in the insulin pump market and had sold their customer database to (“partnered with”) Medtronic.

Animas 2020
The Animas 2020 is an insulin pump that carries 200 units of insulin and can be connected to an infusion set following the Luer standard. Its predecessor was the Animas IR1250.

In April 2013, the Food and Drug Administration issued a Class I Recall for the Animas 2020. The recall specifies an issue with the pump initiating a false alarm or warning sound, which may prompt pump users to inadvertently administer more insulin and can result in a serious health risk.

After Dec. 31, 2015, the unit will no longer function. After this date, the device will generate a Call Service Alarm. This end of use date was not included in the product labeling.

Animas Ping
The Animas Ping is an insulin pump which communicates wirelessly with a meter/display device.

Animas Vibe
In November 2014, the FDA approved the Animas Vibe for managing insulin-required diabetes in adults.

References

Sources
 https://web.archive.org/web/20090702001451/http://www.animascorp.com/2020-insulin-pump-support.aspx

External links
Official website
Animas eStore website
Animas Insulin Pump users group

Canadian Insulin Pump Users:
Official Canadian Website

Johnson & Johnson subsidiaries